The Morrigan's Call is the fifth studio album by the Irish Celtic metal band Cruachan released in 2006.

Track listing

Personnel
Keith Fay - guitars, vocals, keyboards, bouzouki, mandolin, banjo, bodhrán, percussion
Karen Gilligan - vocals
Joe Farrell - drums, percussion
John Ryan - fiddle, violin, mandocello, bowed bass, banjo, death grunts
John Clohessy - bass, aldotrube

Additional personnel
Aine O'Dwyer - Irish harp
John O'Fathaigh - Irish flute, tin whistle, low whistle, recorder, cover art
Gail Liebling - producer, recording, mixing
Matthias Zimmer - layout

Cruachan (band) albums
2006 albums